Lantier is a village and municipality in the Laurentides region of Quebec, Canada, part of the Les Laurentides Regional County Municipality.

Demographics
Population trend:
 Population in 2011: 828 (2006 to 2011 population change: 0.4%)
 Population in 2006: 825
 Population in 2001: 654
 Population in 1996: 631 (or 634 when adjusted for 2001 boundaries)
 Population in 1991: 680

Private dwellings occupied by usual residents: 370 (total dwellings: 762)

Mother tongue:
 English as first language: 8.6%
 French as first language: 88.3%
 English and French as first language: 0%
 Other as first language: 3.1%

Education

Sainte Agathe Academy (of the Sir Wilfrid Laurier School Board) in Sainte-Agathe-des-Monts serves English-speaking students in this community for both elementary and secondary levels.

References

Incorporated places in Laurentides
Municipalities in Quebec